El Asnam, Bouïra is a town and commune in Bouïra Province, Algeria. According to the 1998 census it has a population of 12,060.

References

Communes of Bouïra Province